Howells is a large department store located on St Mary Street in Cardiff, Wales. The store was established in Cardiff by James Howell in 1865. It was acquired by the House of Fraser group in 1972 and re-branded as House of Fraser in 2010.

History
James Howell was the son of a Pembrokeshire farmer. On 21 October 1865, he opened a shop in The Hayes, Cardiff, in a building called Stuart Hall. In August 1867, the drapery shop moved to St Mary Street. By 1892, he had a shop which extended from Trinity Street in the east, to St Mary Street in the west. The first part of the current store was built in the late-19th century, this part of the building includes an ornate facade that is visible on St Mary Street. In the 1920s, a large and well-proportioned neoclassical extension was built up to the corner of St Mary Street and Heol-y-Cawl. A unique result of this extension was that Bethany Chapel, built on the site of an earlier chapel in 1865, was absorbed into the fabric of the building and its frontage was incorporated into the interior and is still visible in the store today, fronting onto the men's Aquascutum department.

Howells Department Store was a family-run business, owned and managed by the family of James Howell. After Howell's death in 1909, his 11 children formed a private limited company, James Howell & Co Ltd. Further extensions were added throughout the 1930s, 1950s and 1960s, causing the building to show the architectural trends of the Late Victorian era to the Modernism of the 1960s.

The James Howell empire extended across Wharton Street, connected by a bridge, where a car showroom was built (now Cotswold Outdoor Ltd), and a funeral home was also established by the family on the St Mary Street side of the store. Both these businesses were short lived, and the car showroom was bought by rival David Morgan, who extended his store, and the premises of the funeral home became part of the store.

In 1963, the store was bought (by this time it was owned by a company in Bournemouth) by Welsh banker Sir Julian Hodge for £3 million, with Hodge promising the ownership would never again leave Wales. The shop was extensively refurbished. In April 1972, Hodge and the Howells directors sold the shop to the House of Fraser chain, in a deal worth £5 million, meaning the store ceased to be an independent department store (or with Welsh ownership). 

While under the ownership of Mohamed Al-Fayed, the House of Fraser chain prompted controversy with its sale of animal fur. In the late 1980s, activists petrol bombed the Howells store, along with the flagship Harrods store and the store's Plymouth branch. The ethical sourcing policy has now sought to resolve this issue, with the company not using any fur products in its clothing.

In the 1990s, the Victorian frontage on St Mary Street, neglected for the best part of 50 years, was cleaned and restored, greatly enhancing the building's appearance.

The building is Grade II* listed.

Present day
Today, the store continues to be a major destination for shoppers, being the second-largest department store in Wales and even more so after the demise of its long-term rival David Morgan in January 2005.

The store underwent a multi-million pound refurbishment, bringing in new fashion labels and modernising the store to bring it in line with the new John Lewis store which opened nearby in late 2009. The department store itself was also rebranded from 'Howells' to the core marque 'House of Fraser', however due to the store's status as a listed building, the 'James Howell & Co' signs remained. In August 2010, banners referring to the store as 'Howells' appeared above the main entrances and the House of Fraser signage.

On 7 June 2018, it was announced that the store would close along with 30 other House of Fraser stores. However, on 27 September 2018 the landlord Naissance Capital Real Estate declared they were working with the House of Fraser team to keep the store open.

In January 2022, the building was acquired by the Thackeray Group, which announced plans to convert the building into an aparthotel with  restaurants, shops, leisure facilities and offices.

In the media
In 2005, the store was used as a set both inside and outside in the revived BBC series Doctor Who. In the opening episode called "Rose", the store was blown up. The shop is used as the set for Rose Tyler's workplace, "Henrik's".

References

Various Contributors, Edited by Stewart Williams. The Cardiff Book No.1. Stewart Williams Publishers 1973 ISBN No. 0-900807-05-9
Various Contributors, Edited by Stewart Williams. The Cardiff Book, Volume 2. Stewart Williams Publishers 1974 ISBN No. 0-900807-09-1
Peter Finch. Real Cardiff, Volume Two, The Greater City. Seren 2004 ISBN No. 1-85411-384-4 pp. 50. 83.

External links

Defunct department stores of the United Kingdom
House of Fraser
Grade II* listed buildings in Cardiff
Shopping in Cardiff
Retail buildings in Wales
Retail companies established in 1865
Castle, Cardiff